Antonio Talens Taberna Jr.  (born January 16, 1975), popularly known as Anthony "Tunying" Taberna and also known as Ka Tunying, is a Filipino broadcast journalist and radio commentator.

At ABS-CBN, Taberna hosted television and radio programs covering news and public affairs. He is a former host of Umagang Kay Ganda (where he gained popularity in the segment "Punto por Punto") and XXX: Exklusibong, Explosibong, Exposé. As a radio anchor, Taberna is one of the lead anchors for Dos por Dos alongside Gerry Baja. He is also the former anchor of Iba-Balita and Mano Mano of Studio 23 and later News+ on S+A.

Biography

Early life and education
Antonio Talens Taberna Jr. was born on January 16, 1975, in San Antonio, Nueva Ecija, the fourth of seven children. His father, Antonio Taberna Sr., was a provincial bus driver in Manila who only finished his education up until high school. His father died on August 18, 2002, after a period of ill health. His mother, Benita Talens Taberna, only finished her elementary education.

Career
Taberna started his career as a part-time news writer in 1992 at DZEC, operated by Eagle Broadcasting Corporation. In 1997, he transferred to DZMM, an AM radio station owned by ABS-CBN where he became a Radyo Patrol reporter. In January 2000, he joined Gerry Baja in Ito Ang Radyo Patrol. The tandem then moved on to Gising Pilipinas in 2002, before they were given their own show, Dos por Dos.

As a television host, Taberna was featured on the morning show Magandang Umaga, Pilipinas and in the documentary program Kalye: Mga Kwento ng Lansangan. Taberna has been widely criticized for his rape victim-blaming on live television. A campaign to remove him from his position due to his bad ethics was met by opposition from Taberna's employer company, ABS-CBN. On July 31, 2020, Taberna left ABS-CBN due to the ABS-CBN franchise renewal controversy when the Philippine Congress rejected the new legislative franchise of the network and he subsequently joined Manila Broadcasting Company's AM radio station DZRH in August 2020 and his show Dos por Dos moved to the station and resumed airing on August 31. On September 6, 2022, Taberna joined All TV and would host the television program Kuha All!

Personal life
Taberna is married to former broadcast journalist Rossel Velasco, and they have two daughters named Zoey and Helga Taberna.

The couple are the owners of the coffee shop-bakery-restaurant Ka Tunying's Cafe. The first branch of his coffee shop is located at Visayas Avenue in Quezon City. The Tabernas also opened additional branches of their cafe due to its popularity.

Filmography

Radio

Television

Controversies

Iglesia Ni Cristo controversy 
On August 30, 2015, Anthony Taberna announced that he will take a leave of absence from his two shows on ABS-CBN, citing "conflict of interest" due to the controversy surrounding the founding family of Iglesia ni Cristo (INC). Taberna was one of the personalities appearing in the INC members' assembly in EDSA on August 30, 2015.

Remarks on rape victim 
On February 19, 2018, a news report showing a video of a 19-year-old girl was delivered. She was allegedly gang-raped after meeting up with someone she was chatting with online. In the background, however, Anthony Taberna’s voice can be heard, saying:

Taberna, however, didn’t stop there. Seemingly cutting off Jeff Canoy, Taberna responded that in truth, women shouldn’t put themselves in dangerous situations.

References

External links
 Anthony Taberna's profile at DZMM

1975 births
Living people
People from Nueva Ecija
Filipino radio journalists
Filipino television journalists
Members of Iglesia ni Cristo
ABS-CBN personalities
ABS-CBN News and Current Affairs people
Manila Broadcasting Company people
New Era University alumni